Rhinoclavis sinensis is a species of sea snail, a marine gastropod mollusk in the family Cerithiidae.

Description
b

Distribution

References

External links
 

Cerithiidae
Gastropods described in 1791
Taxa named by Johann Friedrich Gmelin